The 1992 Pacific hurricane season was the most active season on record, featuring 27 named storms. The season officially started on May 15, in the Eastern Pacific—designated as the area east of 140°W—and on June 1, in the Central Pacific, which is between the International Date Line and 140°W. The season officially ended in both basins on November 30. These dates typically limit the period of each year when most tropical cyclones form in the eastern Pacific basin. Lasting 24 days, Hurricane Tina became the longest lived North Pacific tropical cyclone on record. Its longevity broke the old record for the Eastern and Central Pacific of 20 days, set by Hurricane Fico in 1978; and the old record for the Western Pacific of 22 days, set by Typhoon Rita in 1972.

This timeline documents all the storm formations, strengthening, weakening, landfalls, extratropical transitions, as well as dissipation. The timeline includes information that was not operationally released, meaning that information from post-storm reviews by the National Hurricane Center, such as information on a storm that was not operationally warned on, have been included.

The graphical bar below gives a brief overview of storm activity during the season, and for convenience, the storm's maximum intensity is included as a color bar.

Timeline of events

January
January 28
0600 UTC (8:00 pm HST January 27) - Tropical Depression One-C developed 1,007 mi (1,620.6 km) south of Hilo, Hawaii.
1800 UTC (8:00 am HST) - Tropical Depression One-C intensified into Tropical Storm Ekeka.

January 30
0000 UTC (2:00 pm HST January 29) - Tropical Storm Ekeka intensified into a Category 1 hurricane on the Saffir–Simpson Hurricane Scale.

January 31
1800 UTC (8:00 am HST) - Hurricane Ekeka intensified into a Category 2 hurricane.

February
February 2
0000 UTC (2:00 pm HST February 1) - Hurricane Ekeka intensified into a Category 3 hurricane. Simultaneously, Hurricane Ekeka attained its peak intensity with maximum sustained winds of 115 mph (185 km/h), however, no minimum barometric pressure was measured.
1200 UTC (2:00 am HST) - Hurricane Ekeka weakened back into a Category 2 hurricane.

February 3
0000 UTC (2:00 pm HST February 2) - Hurricane Ekeka weakened back into a Category 1 hurricane.
0600 UTC (8:00 pm HST February 2) - Hurricane Ekeka weakened back into a tropical storm.
1800 UTC (8:00 am HST) - Tropical Storm Ekeka crossed the International Dateline.

March
March 28
0600 UTC (8:00 pm HST March 27) - Tropical Depression Two-C developed 1,477 mi (2,377 km) southwest of Honolulu, Hawaii.

March 29
1200 UTC (2:00 am HST) - Tropical Depression Two-C intensified into Tropical Storm Hali.
1800 UTC (8:00 am HST) - Tropical Storm Hali attained its peak intensity with maximum sustained winds of 50 mph (85 km/h), however, there was no minimum barometric pressure recorded.

March 30
1200 UTC (2:00 am HST) - Tropical Storm Hali weakened back to a tropical depression.
1800 UTC (8:00 am HST) - Tropical Depression Hali dissipated 1,494 mi (2,404.36 km) southwest of Lihue, Hawaii.

April
No tropical cyclones developed during the month of April.

May
The 1992 Eastern Pacific hurricane season officially begins.
No tropical cyclones developed during the month of May.

June
June 1
1200 UTC (5:00 am PDT) - Tropical Depression One-E developed 460 mi (740.30 km) south-southwest of Acapulco de Juárez, Mexico.

June 2
0000 UTC (5:00 pm PDT June 1) - Tropical Depression One-E intensified into Tropical Storm Agatha.

June 3
0000 UTC (5:00 pm PDT June 2)  Tropical Storm Agatha attained its peak intensity with maximum sustained winds of 70 mph (110 km/h) and a minimum barometric pressure of 990 mbar (hPa; 29.23 inHg).

June 5
0000 UTC (5:00 pm PDT June 4) - Tropical Storm Agatha weakened back into a tropical depression.

June 6
0000 UTC (5:00 pm PDT June 5) - Tropical Depression Agatha dissipated 241 mi (387.85 km) southwest of Puerto Vallarta, Mexico.

June 16
exact time unknown - Tropical Depression Two-E forms several hundred miles off the Pacific coast of Mexico.

June 19
exact time unknown - Tropical Depression Two-E dissipates over open waters.

June 22
5 a.m. PDT (1200 UTC) - Tropical Depression Three-E forms 460 mi (740 km) south of the southern tip of Baja California.
5 a.m. PDT (1200 UTC) - Tropical Depression Four-E forms 215 mi (345 km) southwest of San Salvador, El Salvador.
5 p.m. PDT (0000 UTC June 23) - Tropical Depression Three-E strengthens into Tropical Storm Blas.

June 23
11 a.m. PDT (1800 UTC) - Tropical Storm Blas weakens to a tropical depression.
11 a.m. PDT (1800 UTC) - Tropical Depression Four-E strengthens into Tropical Storm Celia.
5 p.m. PDT (0000 UTC June 24) - Tropical Depression Blas dissipates over open waters.

June 24
11 a.m. PDT (1800 UTC) - Tropical Storm Celia strengthens into a hurricane.

June 25
11 p.m. PDT (0600 UTC June 26) - Hurricane Celia strengthens into a Category 2 hurricane.

June 26
11 a.m. PDT (1800 UTC) - Hurricane Celia strengthens into a major hurricane.
5 p.m. PDT (0000 UTC June 27) - Hurricane Celia strengthens into a Category 4 hurricane.

June 28
11 a.m. PDT (1800 UTC) - Hurricane Celia weakens to a Category 3 hurricane.
11 p.m. PDT (0600 UTC June 29) - Hurricane Celia weakens to a Category 2 hurricane.

June 29
5 a.m. PDT (1200 UTC) - Hurricane Celia weakens to a Category 1 hurricane.
11 p.m. PDT (0600 UTC June 30) - Hurricane Celia re-strengthens into a Category 2 hurricane.

June 30
5 p.m. PDT (0000 UTC July 1) - Hurricane Celia weakens to a Category 1 hurricane again.

July
July 1
5 p.m. PDT (0000 UTC July 2) - Hurricane Celia weakens to a tropical storm.

July 2 
5 a.m. PDT (1200 UTC) - Tropical Depression Five-E forms 230 mi (370 km) south of the Gulf of Tehuantepec.
5 p.m. PDT (0000 UTC July 3) - Tropical Storm Celia weakens to a tropical depression.

July 3
5 a.m. PDT (1200 UTC) - Tropical Depression Five-E strengthens into Tropical Storm Darby.

July 4
11 a.m. PDT (1800 UTC) - Tropical Depression Celia dissipates over open waters.
5 p.m. PDT (0000 UTC July 5) - Tropical Storm Darby strengthens into a hurricane.

July 5
5 a.m. PDT (1200 UTC) - Hurricane Darby strengthens into a Category 2 hurricane.
5 p.m. PDT (0000 UTC July 6) - Hurricane Darby strengthens into a major hurricane.

July 6
11 a.m. PDT (1800 UTC) - Hurricane Darby weakens to a Category 2 hurricane.

July 7
5 a.m. PDT (1200 UTC) - Hurricane Darby weakens to a Category 1 hurricane.
5 p.m. PDT (0000 UTC July 8) - Hurricane Darby weakens to a tropical storm.

July 8
5 p.m. PDT (0000 UTC July 9) - Tropical Storm Darby weakens to a tropical depression.
5 p.m. PDT (0000 UTC July 9) - Tropical Depression Six-E forms 690 mi (1,110 km) west-southwest of Acapulco, Mexico.

July 9
11 a.m. PDT (1800 UTC) – Tropical Depression Six-E strengthens into Tropical Storm Estelle.
5 p.m. PDT (0000 UTC July 10) - Tropical Depression Darby dissipates as it loses its tropical characteristics over open waters.

July 10
11 p.m. PDT (0600 UTC July 11) - Tropical Storm Estelle strengthens into a hurricane.

July 11
5 a.m. PDT (1200 UTC) - Hurricane Estelle strengthens into a Category 2 hurricane.
11 a.m. PDT (1800 UTC) - Hurricane Estelle strengthens into a major hurricane.
5 p.m. PDT (0000 UTC July 12) - Hurricane Estelle strengthens into a Category 4 hurricane.

July 12
5 a.m. PDT (1200 UTC) - Hurricane Estelle weakens to a Category 3 hurricane.
5 p.m. PDT (0000 UTC July 13) - Hurricane Estelle weakens to a Category 2 hurricane.
11 p.m. PDT (0600 UTC July 13) - Hurricane Estelle re-strengthens into a Category 3 hurricane.
11 p.m. PDT (0600 UTC July 13) - Tropical Depression Seven-E forms 660 mi (1,065 km) southeast of the southern tip of Baja California.

July 13
5 a.m. PDT (1200 UTC) - Hurricane Estelle re-strengthens into a Category 4 hurricane.
5 p.m. PDT (0000 UTC July 14) - Tropical Depression Seven-E strengthens into Tropical Storm Frank.
11 p.m. PDT (0600 UTC July 14) - Hurricane Estelle weakens to a Category 3 hurricane again.

July 14
5 a.m. PDT (1200 UTC) - Hurricane Estelle weakens to a Category 2 hurricane again.
5 a.m. PDT (1200 UTC) - Tropical Depression Eight-E forms 375 mi (600 km) south of Salina Cruz, Mexico.
11 a.m. PDT (1800 UTC) - Hurricane Estelle weakens to a Category 1 hurricane.
11 p.m. PDT (0600 UTC July 15) - Hurricane Estelle weakens to a tropical storm.
11 p.m. PDT (0600 UTC July 15) - Tropical Storm Frank strengthens into a hurricane.
11 p.m. PDT (0600 UTC July 15) - Tropical Depression Eight-E strengthens into Tropical Storm Georgette.

July 15
5 p.m. PDT (0000 UTC July 16) - Tropical Storm Georgette strengthens into a hurricane.
11 p.m. PDT (0600 UTC July 16) - Hurricane Frank strengthens into a Category 2 hurricane.

July 16
5 a.m. PDT (1200 UTC) - Tropical Storm Estelle weakens to a tropical depression.
5 p.m. PDT (0000 UTC July 17) - Hurricane Frank strengthens into a major hurricane.
11 p.m. PDT (0600 UTC July 17) - Tropical Depression Estelle dissipates as it loses its tropical characteristics over open waters.
11 p.m. PDT (0600 UTC July 17) - Hurricane Georgette strengthens into a Category 2 hurricane.

July 17
11 a.m. PDT (1800 UTC) - Hurricane Frank strengthens into a Category 4 hurricane.

July 18
11 p.m. PDT (0600 UTC July 19) - Hurricane Frank weakens to a Category 3 hurricane.

July 19
5 a.m. PDT (1200 UTC) - Hurricane Georgette weakens to a Category 1 hurricane.
5 p.m. PDT (0000 UTC July 20) - Hurricane Frank weakens to a Category 2 hurricane.

July 20
5 a.m. PDT (1200 UTC) - Hurricane Frank weakens to a Category 1 hurricane.
11 a.m. PDT (1800 UTC) - Hurricane Frank weakens to a tropical storm.
5 p.m. PDT (0000 UTC July 21) - Hurricane Georgette re-strengthens into a Category 2 hurricane.

July 21
11 p.m. PDT (0600 UTC July 22) - Hurricane Georgette weakens to a Category 1 hurricane again.

July 22
5 p.m. PDT (0000 UTC July 23) - Tropical Storm Frank weakens to a tropical depression.
5 p.m. PDT (0000 UTC July 23) - Hurricane Georgette weakens to a tropical storm.

July 23
11 a.m. PDT (1800 UTC) - Tropical Depression Frank dissipates.
11 p.m. PDT (0600 UTC July 24) - Tropical Storm Georgette weakens to a tropical depression.

July 25
11 p.m. PDT (0600 UTC July 26) - Tropical Depression Nine-E forms 440 mi (705 km) southwest of Socorro Island.

July 27
5 a.m. PDT (1200 UTC) - Tropical Depression Nine-E strengthens into Tropical Storm Howard.
5 p.m. PDT (0000 UTC July 28) - Tropical Depression Georgette dissipates over open waters.
5 p.m. PDT (0000 UTC July 28) - Tropical Depression Ten-E forms 345 mi (555 km) south-southwest of Manzanillo, Mexico.

July 28
11 a.m. PDT (1800 UTC) - Tropical Depression Ten-E strengthens into Tropical Storm Isis.

July 30
11 a.m. PDT (1800 UTC) - Tropical Storm Howard weakens to a tropical depression.
5 p.m. PDT (0000 UTC July 31) - Tropical Depression Howard dissipates over open waters.

July 31
11 p.m. PDT (0600 UTC August 1) - Tropical Storm Isis weakens to a tropical depression.

August
August 1
5 p.m. PDT (0000 UTC August 2) - Tropical Depression Isis dissipates over open waters.

August 10

August 13

August 18

August 19
0000 UTC (5:00 pm PDT August 18) - Tropical Depression Thirteen-E intensified into Tropical Storm Kay.

August 20
1800 UTC (11:00 am PDT) - Tropical Depression Fourteen-E intensified into Tropical Storm Lester.

August 21
0600 UTC (11:00 pm PDT August 20) - Tropical Storm Kay weakened back to a tropical storm.

August 22
1800 UTC (11:00 am PDT) - Tropical Storm Lester intensified into a Category 1 hurricane.
August 23
1000 UTC (3:00 am PDT) - Hurricane Lester made landfall near Punta Abreojos, Baja California Sur with winds of 75 mph (120 km/h).
1200 UTC (5:00 am PDT) - Hurricane Lester weakened back to a tropical storm.
2000 UTC (1:00 pm PDT) - Tropical Storm Lester made landfall near Tiburón Island, Sonora with winds of 60 mph (95 km/h).

August 24
1200 UTC (5:00 am PDT) - Tropical Storm Lester weakened back to a tropical depression over southern Arizona.
1800 UTC (11:00 am PDT) - Tropical Depression Lester dissipated over New Mexico.

August 27
1200 UTC (5:00 am PDT) - Tropical Depression Fifteen-E developed 1,093 mi (1759 km) southwest of Cabo San Lucas, Mexico.
1200 UTC (5:00 am PDT) - Tropical Depression Sixteen-E developed 584 mi (939.85 km) south-southeast of Socorro Island.

August 28
0000 UTC (5:00 pm PDT August 27) - Tropical Depression Fifteen-E intensified into Tropical Storm Madeline.
0600 UTC (11:00 pm PDT August 27) - Tropical Depression Sixteen-E intensified into Tropical Storm Newton.

August 29
0000 UTC (5:00 pm PDT August 28) - Tropical Storm Madeline attained its peak intensity with maximum sustained winds of 50 mph (85 km/h) and a minimum barometric pressure of 999 mbar (hPa; 29.5 inHg).

August 30
0600 UTC (11:00 pm PDT August 29) - Tropical Storm Newton attained its peak intensity with maximum sustained winds of 50 mph (85 km/h) and a minimum barometric pressure of 999 mbar (hPa; 29.5 inHg).
1800 UTC (11:00 am PDT) - Tropical Storm Madeline weakened back into a tropical depression.

August 31
0600 UTC (11:00 pm PDT August 30) - Tropical Depression Madeline dissipated 1,020 mi (1651.53 km) south-southeast of Hilo, Hawaii.
1200 UTC (5:00 am PDT) - Tropical Storm Newton weakened back into a tropical depression.

September
September 1
0000 UTC (5:00 pm PDT August 31) - Tropical Depression Newton dissipated 1,334 mi (2146.86 km) southwest of Guadalupe Island.

September 2

September 3
0000 UTC (5:00 pm PDT September 2) - Tropical Depression Seventeen-E intensified into Tropical Storm Orlene.
1800 UTC (11:00 am PDT) - Tropical Storm Orlene intensified into a Category 1 hurricane.

September 4
0600 UTC (11:00 pm PDT September 3) - Hurricane Orlene intensified into a Category 2 hurricane.
1800 UTC (11:00 am PDT) - Hurricane Orlene intensified into a Category 3 hurricane.

September 5
0600 UTC (11:00 pm PDT September 4) - Hurricane Orlene intensified into a Category 4 hurricane.

September 6
1800 UTC (8:00 am HST) - Tropical Depression Eighteen-E entered the Central Pacific Hurricane Centers's area of responsibility.

September 7
1800 UTC (11:00 am PDT) - Hurricane Orlene weakened back to a Category 3 hurricane.

September 8
0000 UTC (2:00 pm HST September 7) - Tropical Depression Eighteen-E intensified into Tropical Storm Iniki.
0600 UTC (11:00 pm PDT September 7) - Hurricane Orlene weakened back to a Category 2 hurricane.
1800 UTC (11:00 am PDT) - Hurricane Orlene weakened back to a Category 1 hurricane.

September 9
0600 UTC (8:00 pm HST September 8) - Tropical Storm Iniki intensified into a Category 1 hurricane.
1200 UTC (5:00 am PDT) - Hurricane Orlene re-intensified into a Category 2 hurricane.

September 10
0000 UTC (2:00 pm HST September 9) - Hurricane Iniki intensified into a Category 2 hurricane.
1200 UTC (2:00 am HST) - Hurricane Iniki intensified into a Category 3 hurricane.
1800 UTC (11:00 am PDT) - Hurricane Orlene weakened back to a Category 1 hurricane.

September 11
0600 UTC (8:00 pm HST September 10) - Hurricane Iniki intensified into a Category 4 hurricane.
1200 UTC (5:00 am PDT) - Hurricane Orlene weakened back to a tropical storm.
1800 UTC (11:00 am PDT) - Tropical Depression Nineteen-E intensified into Tropical Storm Paine.

September 12
0130 UTC (3:30 pm HST September 11) - Hurricane Orlene made landfall near Waimea, Kauai, Hawaii.
0600 UTC (8:00 pm HST September 11) - Hurricane Iniki weakened back to a Category 3 hurricane.
0600 UTC (8:00 pm HST September 11) - Tropical Storm Orlene entered the Central Pacific Hurricane Center's area of responsibility.
1200 UTC (2:00 am HST) - Hurricane Iniki rapidly weakened back to a Category 1 hurricane.
1200 UTC (2:00 am HST) - Tropical Storm Orlene weakened back to a tropical depression.

September 13
1200 UTC (2:00 am HST) - Hurricane Iniki weakened back to a tropical storm.
1800 UTC (11:00 am PDT) - Tropical Storm Paine intensified into a Category 1 hurricane.

September 14
1200 UTC (5:00 am PDT) - Tropical Depression Twenty-E intensified into Tropical Storm Roslyn.
Unknown time - Tropical Depression Orlene made landfall in Kau, Hawaii with winds of 30 mph (45 km/h).
1800 UTC (8:00 am HST) - Tropical Depression Orlene dissipated.
1800 UTC (11:00 am PDT) - Hurricane Paine weakened back to a tropical storm.

September 16
1800 UTC (11:00 am PDT) - Tropical Storm Paine was absorbed by Tropical Storm Roslyn.

September 17

September 18
0000 UTC (5:00 pm PDT) - Tropical Depression Twenty-One-E intensified into Tropical Storm Seymour.
1800 UTC (11:00 am PDT) - Tropical Depression Twenty-Two-E intensified into Tropical Storm Tina.

September 19
1200 UTC (5:00 am PDT) - Tropical Storm Seymour intensified into a Category 1 hurricane.

September 20

September 21
0000 UTC (5:00 pm PDT September 20) - Tropical Storm Tina intensified into a Category 1 hurricane.
0600 UTC (11:00 pm PDT September 20) - Hurricane Seymour weakened back to a tropical storm.

September 22
0000 UTC (5:00 pm PDT September 21) - Hurricane Tina weakened back to a tropical storm.
1800 UTC (11:00 am PDT) - Tropical Storm Seymour re-intensified into a Category 1 hurricane.
1800 UTC (11:00 am PDT) - Tropical Storm Roslyn intensified into a Category 1 hurricane.

September 23
0600 UTC (11:00 pm PDT September 22) - Tropical Storm Tina re-intensified into a Category 1 hurricane.
0600 UTC (11:00 pm PDT September 22) - Hurricane Roslyn intensified into a Category 2 hurricane.
1200 UTC (5:00 am PDT) - Hurricane Roslyn weakened back to a Category 1 hurricane.
1800 UTC (11:00 am PDT) - Hurricane Seymour weakened back to a tropical storm.

September 24
1200 UTC (2:00 am HST) - Hurricane Roslyn entered the Central Pacific Hurricane Center's area of responsibility. Simultaneously, Roslyn weakened back to a tropical storm.

September 25
0000 UTC (5:00 pm PDT September 24) - Hurricane Tina weakened back to a tropical storm.
1200 UTC (5:00 am PDT) - Tropical Storm Seymour weakened to a tropical depression.

September 27
0000 UTC (5:00 pm PDT September 26) - Tropical Storm Tina re-intensified into a Category 1 hurricane.
1200 UTC (5:00 am PDT) - Hurricane Tina intensified into a Category 2 hurricane.

September 28
0000 UTC (5:00 pm PDT September 27) - Hurricane Tina intensified into a Category 3 hurricane.

September 29
1200 UTC (5:00 am PDT) - Hurricane Tina intensified into a Category 4 hurricane.

September 30
0000 UTC (2:00 pm HST September 29) - Tropical Storm Roslyn weakened back to a tropical depression.

October
October 1
1800 UTC (11:00 am PDT) - Tropical Depression Twenty-Three-E intensified into Tropical Storm Virgil.

October 2
1200 UTC (5:00 am PDT) - Hurricane Tina weakened back to a Category 3 hurricane.
1200 UTC (5:00 am PDT) - Tropical Storm Virgil intensified into a Category 1 hurricane.
1800 UTC (11:00 am PDT) - Hurricane Virgil intensified into a Category 2 hurricane.

October 3
0000 UTC (5:00 pm PDT October 2) - Hurricane Tina weakened back to a Category 2 hurricane.
0000 UTC (5:00 pm PDT October 2) - Hurricane Virgil rapidly intensified into a Category 4 hurricane.
1200 UTC (5:00 am PDT) - Hurricane Virgil weakened back to a Category 3 hurricane.
1800 UTC (11:00 am PDT) - Hurricane Tina weakened back to a Category 1 hurricane.

October 4
0000 UTC (5:00 pm PDT October 3) - Hurricane Virgil weakened back to a Category 2 hurricane.
0300 UTC (8:00 pm PDT October 3) - Hurricane Virgil made landfall in Punta Tejupan, Colima with winds of 110 mph (175 km/h).
0600 UTC (11:00 pm PDT October 3) - Hurricane Virgil weakened back to a Category 1 hurricane.
1200 UTC (5:00 am PDT) - Hurricane Virgil weakened back to a tropical storm.
1800 UTC (11:00 am PDT) - Tropical Storm Virgil weakened to a tropical depression.

October 5
0000 UTC (5:00 pm PDT October 4) - Hurricane Tina weakened back to a tropical storm.

October 6
1200 UTC (5:00 am PDT) - Tropical Depression Twenty-Four-E developed .

October 7
0600 UTC (11:00 pm PDT October 6) - Tropical Depression Twenty-Four-E intensified into Tropical Storm Winifred.
1800 UTC (11:00 am PDT) - Tropical Storm Tina weakened back to a tropical depression.

October 8
1200 UTC (5:00 am PDT) - Tropical Storm Winifred intensified into a Category 1 hurricane.

October 9
0000 UTC (5:00 pm PDT October 8) - Hurricane Winifred intensified into a Category 2 hurricane.
1200 UTC (5:00 am PDT) - Hurricane Winifred intensified into a Category 3 hurricane.
1800 UTC (11:00 am PDT) - Hurricane Winifred weakened back to a Category 2 hurricane.
1800 UTC (8:00 am HST) - Tropical Depression Tina entered the Central Pacific Hurricane Center's area of responsibility.
2030 UTC (10:30 am PDT) - Hurricane Winifred made landfall near Manzanillo, Colima with winds of 100 mph (155 km/h).

October 10
0000 UTC (5:00 pm PDT October 9) - Hurricane Winifred rapidly weakened to a tropical storm.
0600 UTC (11:00 pm PDT) - Tropical Storm Winifred weakened to a tropical depression.
1200 UTC (5:00 am PDT) - Tropical Depression Winifred dissipated over central Mexico.

October 11

October 13
1800 UTC (11:00 am PDT) - Tropical Depression Twenty-Five-E developed 616 mi (991.35 km) southwest of Zihuatanejo, Mexico.

October 14
0000 UTC (11:00 pm PDT October 13) - Tropical Depression Twenty-Five-E intensified into Tropical Storm Xavier. Simultaneously, Tropical Storm Xavier attained its peak intensity with maximum sustained winds of 45 mph (75 km/h) and a minimum barometric pressure of 1003 mbar (hPa; 29.62 inHg).
1800 UTC (11:00 am PDT) - Tropical Storm Xavier weakened back to a tropical depression.

October 15
0600 UTC (5:00 am PDT) - Tropical Depression Xavier dissipated 594 mi (956 km) south-southwest of Socorro Island.
1800 UTC (11:00 am PDT) - Tropical Depression Twenty-Six-E developed 606 mi (975.62 km) southwest of Zihuatanejo, Mexico.

October 16
0600 UTC (11:00 pm PDT October 15) - Tropical Depression Twenty-Six-E intensified into Tropical Storm Yolanda.

October 19
0000 UTC (5:00 pm PDT October 18) - Tropical Storm Yolanda attained its peak intensity winds maximum sustained winds of 65 mph (100 km/h) and a minimum barometric pressure of 993 mbar (hPa; 29.32 inHg).

October 20
1800 UTC (11:00 am PDT) - Tropical Storm Yolanda weakened back to a tropical depression.

October 22
1200 UTC (5:00 am PDT) - Tropical Depression Yolanda enters the Central Pacific basin.
1800 UTC (11:00 am PDT) - Tropical Depression Yolanda dissipated 932 mi (1,500 km) east-southeast of Ka Lae, Hawaii.

October 25
1200 UTC (5:00 am PDT) - Tropical Depression Twenty-Seven-E developed roughly 805 mi (1,295 km) south of the southern tip of Baja California Sur, Mexico.

October 26
0000 UTC (5:00 pm PDT October 25) - Tropical Depression Twenty-Seven-E intensified into Tropical Storm Zeke.

October 27
0600 UTC (11:00 pm PDT October 26) - Tropical Storm Zeke weakened back to a tropical depression.

October 28
0000 UTC (5:00 pm PDT October 27) - Tropical Depression Zeke re-intensified into a tropical storm.

October 29
1800 UTC (11:00 am PDT) - Tropical Storm Zeke attained its peak intensity with maximum sustained winds of 50 mph (85 km/h) and a minimum barometric pressure of 1000 mbar (hPa; 29.53 inHg).

October 30
1200 UTC (5:00 am PDT) - Tropical Storm Zeke again weakened back to a tropical depression.
1800 UTC (11:00 am PDT) - Tropical Depression Zeke dissipated 80 mi (128.74 km) north-northwest of Socorro Island.

November

November 22
0000 UTC (2:00 pm HST November 21) - Tropical Depression Three-C developed several hundred miles south-southeast of Hawaii. Simultaneously, Tropical Depression Three-C attained its peak intensity with maximum sustained winds of 35 mph (55 km/h), although no minimum barometric pressure was recorded.

November 23
0000 UTC (2:00 pm HST November 22) - Tropical Depression Three-C dissipated approximately 670 mi (1,080 km) south of the Hawaiian Islands.

November 30
The 1992 Pacific hurricane season officially ends.

See also

List of Pacific hurricanes
Timeline of the 1992 Atlantic hurricane season

References

Pacific hurricane meteorological timelines